The emerald cascader or iridescent stream glider (Zygonyx iris) is a species of dragonfly in the family Libellulidae. It is widespread in many Asian countries.

Subspecies
A number of subspecies of Zygonyx iris have been described, but it is not clear if these merely represent extremes of geographical variation or genuine subspecies.

 Zygonyx iris ceylonicus (Kirby, 1905) 
 Zygonyx iris davina Fraser, 1926
 Zygonyx iris errans Lieftinck, 1953 
 Zygonyx iris insignis (Kirby 1900)
 Zygonyx iris intermedia Lahiri 1987
 Zygonyx iris iris Selys, 1869
 Zygonyx iris isa Fraser, 1926
 Zygonyx iris malabaricus Fraser, 1926
 Zygonyx iris malayanus (Laidlaw, 1902)
 Zygonyx iris metallicus Fraser, 1931
 Zygonyx iris mildredae Fraser, 1926
 Zygonyx iris osiris Fraser, 1936

Description and habitat
It is a dark metallic blue dragonfly with brown eyes. Its thorax has broad humeral stripe in yellow. Its abdomen is black with sides of segments 1 to 3 broadly yellow. There is a yellow mid-dorsal carina from segments 1 to 6. There is a big yellow spot on segment 7. Female is similar to the male.

It breeds in the swift rocky streams. Larva is adapted to cling on rocks. Females lay eggs in first order streams during summer. Apparently, the larva migrates to second or third order streams during their late instars from where they emerge. Males commonly found flying over brooks and streams. They tirelessly fly back and forth across a beat along a hill stream and rarely perch. Sometimes, pairs in tandem can be seen flying above torrents; the female dipping her abdomen periodically to lay eggs

See also 
 List of odonates of Sri Lanka
 List of odonates of India
 List of odonata of Kerala

References

 iris.html World Dragonflies
 Animal diversity web
 Query Results
 Sri Lanka Biodiversity
 Research Gate

External links

Libellulidae
Insects described in 1900